was a prominent Japanese politician and economist. He was widely honored for his scholarship, including the Presidency of the International Economic Association. He received several honorary degrees, including one of two that were ever given to a Japanese citizen by Harvard University.

Early life
He was born in 1912, in Nagoya,Japan to Iyo Shida and Nobuo Tsuru an industrial Engineer.
He also had 3 sisters,Keiko,Sumiko,and Hisako.The Asahi Shimbun
 While in high school in Tokyo he became politically involved in 1929–30, as a student leader in the "Anti-Imperialist Leagues", activities against the Japanese military then in the early stages of aggression towards China. He was imprisoned for several months. Expelled from high school, he was sent abroad to America. His undergraduate work was at Lawrence College and the University of Wisconsin in Madison.

Bibliography
 On Reproduction Schemes, 1942, in Paul Sweezy, Theory of Capitalist Development
 Has Capitalism Changed?: An International Symposium on the Nature of Contemporary Capitalism, (Iwanami, 1961).
 Environmental Disruption: Proceedings of International Symposium, March, 1970, Tokyo, (International Social Science Council, 1970).
 Growth and Resources Problems Related to Japan: Proceedings of Session VI of the Fifth Congress of the International Economic Association held in Tokyo, Japan, (Macmillan, 1978).
 
The Political Economy of the Environment: The Case of Japan. London : Athlone, 1999.
 Towards a New Political Economy, 1976.
 Institutional Economics Revisited, 1993
 Japan's Capitalism: Creative Defeat and Beyond, 1993

References

External links
 Japan's Capitalism: Creative Defeat and Beyond. – book reviews

1912 births
2006 deaths
Harvard University alumni
Marxian economists
20th-century  Japanese economists